Tim Remer (born 29 July 1985) is a Dutch retired handball player.

He represented the Netherlands at the 2020 European Men's Handball Championship.

References

External links

1985 births
Living people
Dutch male handball players
Sportspeople from Rotterdam